...There and Then is a live video consisting of footage taken from three of Oasis' biggest shows from the 1995-96 "(What's the Story) Morning Glory?" tour.  It was released first on VHS on 14 October 1996, then on DVD on 12 November 1997 and later re-released on DVD on 15 October 2001 which included bonus live audio tracks, and promo videos for "Roll with It" and "Acquiesce".

Track list

Notes
Tracks 2, 3, 6, 7, 9, 12, 13, 14, 15, 16 and 18 were recorded at Maine Road, Manchester, England on 28 April 1996
Tracks 4, 5, 8, 10 and 11 were recorded at Earls Court, London, England on 4 November 1995
Track 17 was recorded at Earls Court, London, England on 5 November 1995.

Bonus audio CD
Early copies of the VHS contained a bonus 3-track audio CD.

 "Wonderwall" (Acoustic) (Recorded at Earls Court, London, England on 4 November 1995)
 "Cigarettes & Alcohol" (Recorded at Maine Road, Manchester, England on 28 April 1996)
 "Champagne Supernova" (featuring John Squire of The Stone Roses) (Recorded at Knebworth Park, Stevenage, Hertfordshire, England on 11 August 1996)

"Wonderwall" and "Champagne Supernova" were also included as bonus audio tracks on the ...There and Then DVD Reissue from 2001.

Personnel
 Liam Gallagher – vocals
 Noel Gallagher – lead guitar, vocals
 Paul "Bonehead" Arthurs – rhythm guitar
 Paul McGuigan – bass guitar
 Alan White – drums, percussion

Charts

Certifications

|-

References

Oasis (band) video albums
1996 video albums
Live video albums
1996 live albums
Sony Music live albums
Sony Music video albums
Oasis (band) live albums